is a Japanese actress most known for played the lead role in the 1985 film Love Hotel. She was also the supporting actress in many additional films.

On television, Noriko was the lead actress in Sora o Tonda Kome Sōba (空を飛んだ米相場), Episode #29 of Abarenbō Shōgun V.

Filmography
The Geisha (1983)
Love Hotel (1985)
House of Wedlock (1986)
Onibi (1997)
A Lost Paradise (1997)
 Off-Balance (2001)

References

1959 births
Living people
Actresses from Tokyo